Ebenezer Tremayne Johnson  (January 19, 1871 – November 24, 1960), was a Major League Baseball second baseman and shortstop for the Louisville Colonels during the 1896 and 1897 seasons.

External links 

1871 births
1960 deaths
19th-century baseball players
Augusta Kennebecs players
Buffalo Bisons (minor league) players
Canadian expatriate baseball players in the United States
Major League Baseball second basemen
Major League Baseball players from Canada
Louisville Colonels players
Toledo Swamp Angels players
Terre Haute Hottentots players
Paterson Silk Weavers players
Paterson Weavers players
Montreal Royals players
Rochester Bronchos players
Oakland Oaks (baseball) players